

The following is a list of towns of Poland which lost their town status.

21st century
20th century: 1985– 1977  – 1975 – 1973 – 1972 – 1959 – 1957 – 1956 – 1954 – 1950 – 1948 – 1946 – 1945 – 1939 – 1934 – 1932 – 1928 – 1921 – 1919 – 1915 – 1914
19th century: 1897 – 1896 – 1895 – 1892 – 1888 – 1880  – 1876 – 1875 – 1874 – 1873 – 1870 – 1869 – 1852 – 1824 – 1820 – 1818
Before 19th century

21st century

2002
Wesoła 1969; part of Warsaw now

20th century

1977
Ursus 1952; part of Warsaw now
Ząbkowice 1962; part of Dąbrowa Górnicza now

1975
Boguszowice 1962, part of Rybnik now
Brzeziny Śląskie 1951; part of Piekary Śląskie now
Fordon part of Bydgoszcz now
Grodziec 1951; part of Będzin now
Kazimierz Górniczy 1967; part of Sosnowiec now
Klimontów 1967; part of Sosnowiec now
Kostuchna 1967; part of Katowice now
Kraśnik Fabryczny 1954; part of Kraśnik now
Murcki 1967; part of Katowice now
Niedobczyce 1945; part of Rybnik now
Strzemieszyce Wielkie 1945; part of Dąbrowa Górnicza now
Wesoła 1962; part of Mysłowice now
Zagórze 1967; part of Sosnowiec now

1973
Brzozowice-Kamień 1962; in 1973 incorporated into Brzeziny Śląskie, since 1975 part of Piekary Śląskie
Łagisza 1967; currently a borough of Będzina, śląskie)
Miasteczko Krajeńskie 14th century; wielkopolskie)
Porąbka 1967; part of Sosnowiec now
Rozwadów 1693; part of Stalowa Wola now
Węgierska Górka 1958

1972
Boleszkowice (1331?)

1959
Szopienice (1947; currently a borough of Katowice

1957
Rembertów (1939; currently a borough of Warsaw

1956
Szczakowa (1933; currently a borough of Jaworzno

1954
Łabędy (1954; currently a borough of Gliwice

1950
Krynki (1569

1948
Dąbie (1249; part of Szczecin now

1946
Biskupiec Pomorski 1331
Bukowsko 18th century
Dąbrówno 1326
Nowotaniec 1444
Ruda Pabianicka 1923; part of Łódź now

1945
Banie 1230 
Barciany 1628
Bledzew 1458
Bobrowice 1809
Brody (1454
Brzostek 1394
Chełmsko Śląskie 1289
Dobromierz before 1289 
Domaradz 15th century 
Dubiecko 1407
Dubienka 1588 
Gardeja 1334
Janów Podlaski 1465, lost in 1870 and since 1915
Jaśliska 1366  
Jawornik Polski 1472 
Kalwaria Pacławska (17th century; podkarpackie)
Krasiczyn (XVII wiek; podkarpackie)
Krzywcza (1398; podkarpackie)
Lubniewice (1808; lubuskie)
Lubrza (1319; lubuskie)
Miłomłyn  (1335; warmińsko-mazurskie)
Tyrawa Wołoska (XVIII wiek; podkarpackie)
Uście Gorlickie (1512; małopolskie)
Widuchowa (prior to 1283; zachodniopomorskie)

1939
Police, Poland (1260; regained town status in 1949)

1935
Pruchnik (ok. 1436; podkarpackie)

1934
Babice (1484; podkarpackie)
Bircza (XV wiek; podkarpackie)
Bnin (1395; currently a borough of Kórnik; wielkopolskie)
Bobowa (1399; małopolskie)
Czarny Dunajec (1880; małopolskie)
Dobrzyca (około 1440); wielkopolskie)
Gąsawa (1388; kujawsko-pomorskie)
Jaśliska (1366; podkarpackie)
Lanckorona (1361; małopolskie)
Lutowiska (1764 (1742?); podkarpackie)
Lipnica Murowana (1326; małopolskie)
Milówka (1872; śląskie)
Nowy Dwór (1578; podlaskie)
Piaski (1775; wielkopolskie)
Tymbark (1353; małopolskie)
Zakliczyn (1558;, regained town status in 2006

1932
Krościenko 1348
Łagów (1808; lubuskie)

1928
Dobroszyce (1663; dolnośląskie)

1926
Oliwa (1874; currently a borough of Gdańsk; pomorskie)

1921
Kuźnica Białostocka (1546; podlaskie)

1919
Baligród (1634; podkarpackie)
Czudec (1427; podkarpackie)
Dębowiec (1349; podkarpackie)
Jaćmierz (XV wiek; podkarpackie)
Jasienica Rosielna  (1727; podkarpackie)
Kołaczyce (1354; podkarpackie)
Korczyna (XV wiek; podkarpackie)
Lutowiska (XVII wiek; podkarpackie)
Mrzygłód (1431); podkarpackie)
Niebylec (XV wiek; podkarpackie)
Nowy Żmigród (1373); podkarpackie)
Ołpiny (XIX wiek; małopolskie)
Osiek Jasielski (1365; podkarpackie)
Wielopole Skrzyńskie (XVI wiek; podkarpackie)
Zarszyn (1395; podkarpackie)

1915
Frysztak (1366; podkarpackie)

1914
Tylicz (1612; małopolskie)

19th century

1897
Gródek (1558; podlaskie)

1896
Dubiecko (1407; podkarpackie)

1895
Berżniki (prior to 1559; podlaskie)
Dubin (1284; wielkopolskie)

1892
Bolesławów (1581; dolnośląskie)

1888
Łekno (1370; wielkopolskie)
Łopienno (. XVI w.; wielkopolskie)

1880
Lubycza Królewska (1759; lubelskie)
Przecław (prior to 1419; podkarpackie)

1876
Żarnów (1415; łódzkie)

1875
Bralin (prior to 1540; wielkopolskie)

1874
Kamionna (prior to 1402, again in 1638; wielkopolskie)

1873
Kwieciszewo (1342; kujawsko-pomorskie)

1870
Adamów, Łuków County (1539; Lublin Voivodeship)
Andrzejewo (1528; Masovian Voivodeship)
Bakałarzewo (prior to 1589; Podlaskie Voivodeship)
Baranów 1544
Będków 1453
Białaczów 1456, again 1787
Bielawy 1403
Biskupice 1450
Bobrowniki 1485
Bodzanów 1351
Bolimów about 1370
Brdów 1436
Burzenin 1378
Chocz 14th century 
Czemierniki 1509
Czersk before 1350 
Czerwińsk nad Wisłą bishop's part in 1373, monastery part in 1582, both joined in late 18th century
Filipów 1570 
Firlej 1557 
Gielniów 1455
Głowaczów 1445 
Goraj 1405 
Goszczyn 1386 
Grabowiec (prior to 1418) 
Horodło 1432 
Iłów 1506 
Inowłódz about 1350 
Izbica 1540 
Jadów 1819 
Janowiec 1537 
Janów 1696 
Jeżów 1334 
Kamieńczyk before 1428 
Kamionka 1458
Kazimierz Biskupi 1287
Kiernozia 1523 
Kikół 1745 
Klimontów 1604
Kodeń 1511 
Kołbiel 1532 
Komarów-Osada 1748 
Końskowola 1532
Koźminek before 1369 
Krasnosielc (1824 
Kurów before 1442 
Liw before 1421 
Lutomiersk (1274
Łaszczów (1549
Łysobyki (1533–1564 as Przetoczno; in 1965 name has been changed again, this time to Jeziorzany
Łomazy before 1566
Maciejowice 1507
Magnuszew 1377, lost 1576, again gained in 1776
Nowy Korczyn before 1375
Rejowiec 1547
Stawiski about 1688
Stopnica 1362 
Wolbórz 1273

1869
Cegłów 1621
Kamionka (before 1450)
Łagów 1375
Stężyca 1330
Wiskitki 1349, ponownie 1595

1800
Jeleniewo

Before 19th century
 Bydlin 1530
 Rybotycze 15th century
 Jodłowa 1359
 Police, Poland (1260; regained town status in 1808)

 
Historical cities
Former subdivisions of Poland